The men's light heavyweight event was part of the boxing programme at the 1984 Summer Olympics. The weight class allowed boxers of up to 81 kilograms to compete. The competition was held from 30 July to 11 August 1984. 24 boxers from 24 nations competed.

Schedule 
All times are PDT (UTC−8).

Medalists

Results
The following boxers took part in the event:

First round
 Michael Nassoro (TNZ) def. Juha Hanninen (FIN), RSCH-1
 Syivaus Okello (KEN) def. Ahmed El-Naggar (EGY), RSC-3
 Evander Holyfield (USA) def. Taju Akay (GHA), RSC-3
 Ismail Salman (IRQ) def. Anthony Longdon (GRN), KO-2
 Jean-Paul Nanga (CMR) def. Philip Pinder (BAH), 5:0
 Christer Corpi (SWE) def. Arcadio Fuentes (PUR), KO-1
 Kevin Barry (NZL) def. Don Smith (TRI), 5:0
 Jonathan Kiriisa (UGA) def. Djiguble Traoré (MLI), 5:0

Second round
 Mustapha Moussa (ALG) def. Drake Thadzi (MLW), 5:0
 Anthony Wilson (GBR) def. Roberto Oviedo (ARG), RSC-1
 Georgica Donici (ROU) def. Fine Sani (TNG), 5:0
 Anton Josipović (YUG) def. Markus Bott (FRG), 4:1
 Syivaus Okello (KEN) def. Michael Nassoro (TNZ), 5:0
 Evander Holyfield (USA) def. Ismail Salman (IRQ), RSC-2
 Jean-Paul Nanga (CMR) def. Christer Corpi (SWE), 4:1
 Kevin Barry (NZL) def. Jonathan Kiriisa (UGA), 3:2

Quarterfinals
 Mustapha Moussa (ALG) def. Anthony Wilson (GBR), 5:0
 Anton Josipović (YUG) def. Georgica Donici (ROU), 5:0
 Evander Holyfield (USA) def. Syivaus Okello (KEN), KO-1 
 Kevin Barry (NZL) def. Jean-Paul Nanga (CMR), 4:1

Semifinals
 Anton Josipović (YUG) def. Mustapha Moussa (ALG), 5:0
 Kevin Barry (NZL) def. Evander Holyfield (USA), DSQ-2
Holyfield was controversially disqualified for punching Barry after what seemed to be a stop. However, on a replay it is seen that the referee stopped the bout after his punches.

Final
 Anton Josipović (YUG) def. Kevin Barry (NZL), walk-over
Under IABA health regulation Barry was not allowed to box for 28 days, so he scratched from the final. During the medal ceremony, Josipović shared the highest step of the podium with Holyfield and raised his hand, thus acknowledging that Evander was the real winner.

References

Light Heavyweight